In embryology, sturt is a measure of distance.  On the fate map, the further apart two regions are, the more likely the resulting structures are to form different genotypes.  A difference of 1% in the ratio of differing genotypes is described as one sturt, after Alfred Henry Sturtevant.

References
 

Developmental biology